Amathillopsidae is a family of crustaceans belonging to the order Amphipoda.

Genera:
 Amathillopsis Heller, 1875
 Cleonardopsis Barnard, 1916
 Parepimeria Chevreux, 1911

References

Crustaceans